SPS Tower (formerly known as the 333 South Seventh Street) is a 454.494-ft (139 m) tall skyscraper in Minneapolis, Minnesota. It is the 16th-tallest building in the city. It was originally a two-tower project, but only the east tower was built. A small landscaped plaza fronting 3rd Avenue South now occupies the plot for the west tower. The two towers would have had a bow-tie shaped footprint, and shared the same lobby at the center of the site. A skyway connects this building to the 701 Building and the Ameriprise Financial Center. The Senator Hotel was demolished to make way for this building.

See also
List of tallest buildings in Minneapolis

References
Emporis
SPS Tower

Skyscraper office buildings in Minneapolis
Office buildings completed in 1987

Kohn Pedersen Fox buildings